Verkhnyaya Lipovka is a rural locality (a selo) in Ternovskoye Rural Settlement, Kamyshinsky District, Volgograd Oblast, Russia. The population was 351 as of 2010. There are 7 streets.

Geography 
Verkhnyaya Lipovka is located in forest steppe, on the Volga Upland, on the Lipovka River, 15 km northeast of Kamyshin (the district's administrative centre) by road. Nizhnyaya Lipovka is the nearest rural locality.

References 

Rural localities in Kamyshinsky District